Odontogomphus is a genus of dragonflies in the family Gomphidae, 
endemic to north-eastern Queensland, Australia.
The single known species is a medium-sized and slender dragonfly, with black and greenish-yellow markings.

Species
The genus includes only one species:

Odontogomphus donnellyi  - Pinchtail

See also
 List of Odonata species of Australia

References

Gomphidae
Anisoptera genera
Monotypic Odonata genera
Odonata of Australia
Endemic fauna of Australia
Taxa named by J.A.L. (Tony) Watson
Insects described in 1991